Matheson Glacier is a glacier  long, lying  south of Ashton Glacier, which it parallels, and flowing in an easterly direction to the west side of Lehrke Inlet, on the east coast of Palmer Land, Antarctica. It was first sighted by members of the United States Antarctic Service who explored this coast by land and from the air in December 1940, and was first charted by a joint party consisting of members of the Ronne Antarctic Research Expedition and Falkland Islands Dependencies Survey (FIDS) in 1947. The glacier was named by the FIDS for J. Matheson, a member of the FIDS at the Port Lockroy and Hope Bay bases, 1944–46.

References

Glaciers of Palmer Land